Fattah may refer to:

 al-Fattāḥ, one of the names of God in Islam, and translates to "opener" or "victory giver"

People with the given name or surname
Fattah is a male given name and surname in the Arabic language.
 Omar Fattah Hussain, an Iraqi Kurdish politician
 Tamar Fattah Ramadhan Kuchar, an Iraqi Kurdish politician
 Chaka Fattah, an American politician
 Parviz Fattah, an Iranian politician

Places
 Fattah, an alternative name for a village in West Azerbaijan Province, Iran

See also
 Fatah (disambiguation)
 Fateh (disambiguation)